Almvik is a village situated in Västervik Municipality, Kalmar County, Sweden with 202 inhabitants in 2005.

References 

Populated places in Kalmar County
Populated places in Västervik Municipality